Eremias stummeri (commonly known as Stummer's racerunner or Tien-Shan racerunner) is a species of lizard found in Kyrgyzstan and Kazakhstan.

References

Eremias
Reptiles described in 1940
Taxa named by Otto von Wettstein